Nick Garcia (born April 9, 1979 in Plano, Texas) is an American former soccer player.

Career

Youth and College
As a junior and senior at Bishop Lynch High School in Dallas, Texas, Garcia helped his high school win their first 2 TAPPS state boys soccer championships in 1996 and 1997. He was selected to the all-district, all-state and all-tournament teams. Garcia won the 1996–97 Gatorade National Boys Soccer Player of the Year award, as well, while starring for Dallas Texans youth club. Garcia played college soccer at Indiana University, leading Indiana to the consecutive national titles in 1998 and 1999, and was named All-American in his final season. Garcia was also named the Soccer America National Freshman of the year while at Indiana University and won the 1999 NCAA Defensive MVP in the College Cup Tournament.

Professional
Garcia signed with Project-40 and MLS in 2000, and was drafted second overall (behind Steve Shak) in the 2000 MLS SuperDraft by the Kansas City Wizards.

Garcia subsequently played in – and started – 224 games for the Wizards between 2000 and 2007 and helped the Wizards win the MLS Cup in 2000, and the US Open Cup in 2004.

He joined the San Jose Earthquakes as their captain upon their return to MLS in 2008. In early 2009 Garcia signed a multi-year contract with San Jose, but was traded (along with the rights to Canadian international Ali Gerba) to Toronto FC on June 9, 2009 for a third round pick in the 2010 MLS SuperDraft.

After the 2010 MLS season Toronto declined Garcia's contract option and he elected to participate in the 2010 MLS Re-Entry Draft. Garcia became a free agent in Major League Soccer when he was not selected in the Re-Entry draft.

International
Garcia played in the 1997 World Youth Championship in Ecuador and captained the US Under-20 national team at the World Youth Championship in Nigeria in 1999. Garcia earned his first cap for the full national team on January 18, 2003, against Canada. So far, he has amassed six caps for the United States.

Personal life
Garcia is married to his wife MeLinda. They have 3 children  children.

Honors

Kansas City Wizards
 Lamar Hunt U.S. Open Cup: 2004
 Major League Soccer MLS Cup: 2000
 Major League Soccer Supporters' Shield: 2000
 Major League Soccer Western Conference Championship: 2004

Toronto FC
 Canadian Championship: 2009, 2010

References

External links
 

1979 births
Living people
American soccer players
Indiana Hoosiers men's soccer players
Sporting Kansas City players
San Jose Earthquakes players
Toronto FC players
Sportspeople from Plano, Texas
United States men's international soccer players
American sportspeople of Mexican descent
NCAA Division I Men's Soccer Tournament Most Outstanding Player winners
Expatriate soccer players in Canada
American expatriate sportspeople in Canada
Major League Soccer players
United States men's youth international soccer players
United States men's under-20 international soccer players
Sporting Kansas City draft picks
Association football defenders
All-American men's college soccer players